Mees Bakker (born 11 March 2001) is a Dutch professional footballer who plays as a goalkeeper for Eerste Divisie club De Graafschap, on loan from AZ.

Club career
He made his Eerste Divisie debut for Jong AZ on 20 August 2018 in a game against Almere City, as a starter.

On 7 July 2022, Bakker joined De Graafschap on a season-long loan with an option to buy.

International career
He made one group-stage appearance with the Netherlands national under-17 football team at the 2018 UEFA European Under-17 Championship and was the backup in the other games, as Netherlands won the tournament.

Honours

International
Netherlands U17
 UEFA European Under-17 Championship: 2018

References

External links
 

2001 births
People from Heiloo
Living people
Dutch footballers
Netherlands youth international footballers
Association football goalkeepers
Jong AZ players
De Graafschap players
Eerste Divisie players
Footballers from North Holland
21st-century Dutch people